Yevgeny Mikhaylovich Makarenko (born 10 October 1975) is a boxer from Russia best known to win two world titles 2001 and 2003 at light heavyweight, and him being a part of the 2005 Russian team at the Boxing World Cup.

Career
Makarenko won a bronze in 1998 and dominated light heavyweight between 2001 and 2006.

In 2005 he was part of the Russian team that won the 2005 Boxing World Cup.

He won gold medals at 
the 2001 World Amateur Boxing Championships,
the 2002 European Amateur Boxing Championships
the 2003 World Amateur Boxing Championships where he beat Rudolf Kraj.
the 2004 European Amateur Boxing Championships in Pula, Croatia.
and the 2005 Boxing World Cup.

He also participated in the 2004 Summer Olympics but was upset in the quarterfinals of the Light heavyweight (81 kg) division by USA's eventual winner Andre Ward.

2006 he beat highly touted newcomer Artur Beterbiev but lost to him in 2007 hindering from participating in the World Championships.

References

External links
Yahoo! Sports

1975 births
Living people
Heavyweight boxers
Boxers at the 2004 Summer Olympics
Olympic boxers of Russia
Russian male boxers
AIBA World Boxing Championships medalists